Group C of the 2007 AFC Asian Cup was one of four groups of nations competing at the 2007 AFC Asian Cup. The group's first round of matches began on 10 July and its last matches were played on 18 July. All six group matches were played at venues in Kuala Lumpur, Malaysia. The group consisted of hosts Malaysia, Iran, Uzbekistan and China PR.

Standings

All times are UTC+8.

Malaysia vs China PR

Iran vs Uzbekistan

Uzbekistan vs Malaysia

China PR vs Iran

Malaysia vs Iran

Uzbekistan vs China PR 

2007 AFC Asian Cup
2007 in Malaysian football
2007 in Chinese football
2007 in Uzbekistani football
2007–08 in Iranian football